Tattooing in Burma was a widespread custom practiced by various ethnic groups, including the Bamar, Shan, and Karen, until the 20th century. Tattooing was a distinguishing cultural marker and a symbol of strength, courage and intimidation for Lethwei fighters.

Origins 
Among the Bamar, the custom of tattooing originates from the Shan people, who believed that tattoos had magical or spiritual connotations, used in a similar manner as amulets and protective charms. This practice coincided with the Shan States' control of Upper Burma from the 14th to 17th centuries, as the Shan, themselves tattooed, introduced this practice to the Bamar.

The Arakanese people who are related to the Bamar did not practice tattooing. Similarly, the Mon people did practice tattooing, but did not tattoo their thighs unlike the Bamar.

However, with the onset of colonial rule in Burma, the practice of tattooing quickly became extinct, particularly in Burmese towns. During the 1930s, tattooing saw a resurgence in popularity among rebels who participated in peasant and millennial uprisings. Men tattooed themselves to provide immunity to bullets and knives. The practice of tattoo is regaining popularity among Burmese youth.

Pigments 
Burmese tattoo pigments traditionally used diluted red mercury sulphide and soot from an oil lamp. For black pigments, the soot was mixed with the dried gallbladder of fish or cattle in powder form, boiled in water and simmered with the leaves of bitter melon. A product was reduced to paste form and dried until usage. A greenish tinge was produced by dabbing the pierced areas of the skin with leaves of Senna siamea or Brugmansia suaveolens.

Tattooing among men 

Tattooing was a painful procedure that could required extensive use of opium used as a painkiller. A professional tattoo artist ( or ) used a hnitkwasok, a long two-pronged brass or iron instrument with a  slit similar to a double-pointed pen, to pierce the skin. Completion of the tattoos took from 3 to 6 days. Nearly all Bamar men were tattooed at boyhood (between the ages of 8 and 14), from the waist to the knees. The tattooed patterns were ornamented pastiches of arabesques and animals and legendary creatures, including cats, monkeys, chinthe, among others. For the Bamar, tattooing of the waist, done with black pigment, was done before or soon after temporary ordination into monkhood, a major rite of passage for men. Other parts of the body were tattooed with red pigments. Among the Shan, blue or red pigments were especially popular, as were charms and cabalistic figures similar to yantra tattoos.

Htoe Kwin 
Throughout its history, Htoe Kwin tattooing were deeply rooted in Myanmar's Lethwei culture and masculine identity. From kings to commoners, these tattoos were exemplars of masculine strength and bravery. Htoe Kwin were tattooed to upper parts of the legs and covered the entire leg until just below the knee line. The very painful process was seen as a rite of passage, from boyhood to becoming a man. They would be made of circles or squares filled with cultural imagery drawn inside each circle depending on the region of the bearer.

Tattooing among women

Southern Chin women were also tattooed on their faces with closely set lines using blue pigments, ostensibly to discourage them from being kidnapped by invaders. Chin women were typically tattooed between the ages of 15 and 20. The practice has quickly disappeared, as it was banned in the 1960s by Burma's socialist regime and it was discouraged by Christian missionaries. Mro women also wore tattoos in the form of small marks or stars on the cheek, forehead or breast.

See also
Yantra tattooing
Culture of Burma

References

Tattooing traditions
Burmese culture